Luxembourgers are a Germanic ethnic group native to their nation state of Luxembourg, where they make up around half of the population. They share the culture of Luxembourg and speak Luxembourgish, a West Germanic language.

Luxembourgers were, much like Austrians, historically considered to be a regional sub-group of ethnic Germans and viewed themselves as such until the collapse of the German Confederation. Luxembourg became independent, while remaining in personal union with the Netherlands, after the signing of the Treaty of London in 1839. The personal union proved short-lived as it was bilaterally and amicably dissolved in 1890.

Legally, all citizens of the Grand Duchy of Luxembourg are considered to be Luxembourgers per Luxembourgish law, although a distinct Germanic ethnolinguistic identification is vocally espoused and promoted. The corresponding adjective is "Luxembourgish".

Historical background 

Most ethnic Luxembourgers live in the Grand Duchy of Luxembourg, a small country in Europe between Germany, France, and Belgium, and are of Celtic/Gallo-Roman and Germanic (Frankish) origin. Luxembourgish is the only native language of Luxembourgers (as taught by parents), although nearly all of them learn French and German in school and are able to communicate in these two languages as well from an early age on. Despite the rather small number of Luxembourgers, there is a relatively large diaspora, in Europe and elsewhere. Particularly, there are populations in the surrounding countries of Belgium, France, and Germany. For the most part, this is due to historic reasons, especially the three Partitions of Luxembourg, which led to former territories of Luxembourg being incorporated into each of the three surrounding countries.

There are also significant populations in the Americas, with the largest contingent being in the United States. Others migrated to Hungary along with Germans during the first phase of German eastward settlement in the 12th century (and, later on, during the Modern Age). Transylvanian Saxons (in particular) and Banat Swabians (partly) are the descendants of these settlers. Furthermore, the Transylvanian Saxon dialect is very close to Luxembourgish.

The explanation for the cultural, ethnic, and linguistic ties between the Saxons in Transylvania and the Luxembourgers is rather simple, namely that the first waves of Transylvanian Saxon settlers who colonised parts of Transylvania, present-day central Romania stemmed from the Rhine-Moselle river valley region and, implicitly, from Luxembourg as well. These settlers were part of the Ostsiedlung colonisation process in Central and Eastern Europe and were invited during the late 12th century, during the High Middle Ages, by the King of Hungary Géza II to develop, fortify, and defend southern and south-eastern Transylvania against invading Asian peoples (e.g. Cumans, Pechenegs, Mongols, or Tatars).

See also

 Luxembourgish Americans
Luxembourgish Brazilian
 Portuguese Luxembourger

Notes and references

Sources

Ethnic groups in Luxembourg
 
Germanic ethnic groups